Jones Valley is a snow-covered valley between West Prongs and Elliott Ridge in the southern Neptune Range of the Pensacola Mountains in Antarctica. It was mapped by the United States Geological Survey from surveys and from U.S. Navy air photos, 1956–66, and was named by the Advisory Committee on Antarctic Names for Lieutenant James G.L. Jones, U.S. Navy, a member of the Ellsworth Station winter party in 1958.

References

Valleys of Queen Elizabeth Land